is a railway station in the city of Ōgaki, Gifu Prefecture Japan, operated by the private railway operator Yōrō Railway.

Lines

Station layout
Kita-Ōgaki Station has one ground-level side platform serving  single bi-directional track. The station is unattended.

Adjacent stations

|-
!colspan=5|Yōrō Railway

History
Kita-Ōgaki Station opened on July 1, 1944.

Passenger statistics
In fiscal 2015, the station was used by an average of 379 passengers daily (boarding passengers only).

Surrounding area
 Tsushima Jinja

See also
 List of Railway Stations in Japan

References

External links

 

Railway stations in Gifu Prefecture
Railway stations in Japan opened in 1944
Stations of Yōrō Railway
Ōgaki